The Interrogator may refer to:
The Interrogator (wrestler), alias used by wrestler Robert Maillet
The Interrogator (TV play), a 1961 British TV play
The Interrogator (Mission: Impossible), an episode of Mission: Impossible